is a Japanese manga artist born in 1958 from Iwate Prefecture. He is best known for Dragon Zakura for which he received the 29th Kodansha Manga Award. Dragon Zakura has been adapted to live-action television series in Japan and South Korea, its spin-off series Angel Bank received live-action television adaptation as well. 
His manga Investor Z was adapted into live-action television series in 2018 and The Great War of Archimedes was adapted into a film in 2019.

Works
Eiji's Tailor (Big Comic Original Zōkan, Shogakukan)
 (Manga Goraku Next, Nihon Bungeisha)
 (Monthly Afternoon, Kodansha)
Boys of Summer (Big Comic Spirits, Shogakukan)
 (Weekly Playboy, Shueisha)
 (Weekly Manga Goraku, Nihon Bungeisha)
 (Evening, Kodansha)
 (Weekly Young Magazine, Kodansha)
 (Weekly Morning, Kodansha)
 (Weekly Morning, Kodansha)
 (Big Comic Superior, Shogakukan)
 (Super Jump, Shueisha)
 (Weekly Per Golf, Gakken)
 (Evening, Kodansha)
 (Weekly Young Magazine, Kodansha)
 (Weekly Morning, Kodansha)
 (Weekly Young Magazine, Kodansha) ( 2015 -)

References

1958 births
Living people
Manga artists from Iwate Prefecture
Winner of Kodansha Manga Award (General)